Pretty Polly Stakes may refer to:

Pretty Polly Stakes (Great Britain), a horse race held at Newmarket Racecourse in Great Britain
Pretty Polly Stakes (Ireland), a horse race held at the Curragh Racecourse in Ireland